Spathelia is a genus in the plant family Rutaceae, subfamily Cneoroideae. Species records are from central America and the Caribbean.

Species
Plants of the World Online currently includes:
 Spathelia bahamensis Vict.
 Spathelia belizensis Acev.-Rodr. & S.W.Brewer
 Spathelia brittonii P.Wilson
 Spathelia coccinea Proctor
 Spathelia cubensis P.Wilson
 Spathelia glabrescens Planch.
 Spathelia simplex L. - type species
 Spathelia splendens Urb.
 Spathelia subintegra Vict.
 Spathelia vernicosa Planch.
 Spathelia wrightii Vict.

References

External links
 

 
Rutaceae genera
Taxonomy articles created by Polbot